Prison or penitentiary, is a correctional facility.

Penitentiary may also refer to:

 Apostolic Penitentiary, a tribunal of mercy, responsible for issues relating to the forgiveness of sins in the Roman Catholic Church
 canon penitentiary, a clergyman attached to a major church to serve as a general confessor
 Penitentiary (1938 film)
 Penitentiary (1979 film)
 Penitentiary Point, a cliff in Utah